The following are the national records in speed skating in Poland maintained by the Polish Speed Skating Association (PZŁS).

Men

Women

References

External links
 PZŁS website
 Polish Speed Skating records

National records in speed skating
Records
Speed skating
Speed skating-related lists
Speed skating